Black Rocks (or Stonnis Rocks), is a small outcrop of ashover gritstone, between Cromford and Wirksworth in Derbyshire, the Peak District, England. It is an important crag in the history of British rock climbing, and has some of the most extreme climbing routes in Britain, including Gaia.

Climbing history
The crag has been a well-known traditional climbing venue since the 1890s, and features in the early 1913 guidebook, Some Gritstone Climbs. Its northerly aspect means that it is frequently in damp condition (and even covered in a green algae), however, the sandstone-like gritstone rock dries reasonably quickly.

Important names in British climbing history have left their mark at Black Rocks such as James W. Puttrel (Stonnis Crack HVS 4b, 1900), Fred Pigott (Sand Buttress VS 4c, 1920), and Peter Harding (Demon Rib E4 5c, 1949, and Promontory Traverse E1 5b, 1945).

The two best-known Black Rocks climbs are Gaia (grade E8 6c, first free ascent by Johnny Dawes in 1986), and Meshuga (grade E9 6c, first free ascent by Seb Grieve in 1997), which are located on the main overhanging promontory section.  Both climbs are featured in several climbing films including Stone Monkey (1988) capturing Dawes first ascent of Gaia, Hard Grit (1998) in which French climber Jean-Minh Trin-Thieu takes a large fall on Gaia, and Dosage Volume 4 (2006), in which American climber Lisa Rands made the first female ascent of Gaia. In 2008, American climbers Kevin Jorgeson and Alex Honnold, both completed free solos of Meshuga, while Honnold also completed the first-ever flash of Gaia.

In November 2000, Charlie Woodburn completed a direct finish to Gaia called Harder, Faster, and graded it E9 7a; a fall from the crux near the top would likely be fatal, and it is thus considered one of the most dangerous climbs in Britain, and rarely repeated, with only its third ascent in December 2020.

Filmography
 Rands on Gaia: 
 Hardest Peak District: 
 Dawes' FFA of Gaia:

Bibliography
Froggatt to Black Rocks (Dave Westlake), June 2010, British Mountaineering Council. .
Eastern Grit, 3rd Edition (Chris Craggs), April 2015, RockFax. .

Gallery

See also

Rock climbing in the Peak District

References

External links
Alex Honnold onsighting "Gaia" (E8 6c) at Black Rocks, England PlanetMountain (November 2008)
Neil Mawson huge fall on “Meshuga” (E9/5.12D, RX) Rock & Ice (April 2021)
James Pearson huge fall on "Harder, Faster" (E9 7a) PlanetMountain (December 2020)

Climbing areas of England
Landforms of Derbyshire
Geology of Derbyshire
Mountains and hills of the Peak District
Rock formations of England